The 142nd Field Artillery Battalion was a Field Artillery Branch battalion of the Colorado Army National Guard.

Lineage
Organized 27 July 1885 in the Colorado National Guard as Company C, 1st Regiment Infantry (Greeley Guards).
Mustered out 6 October 1888 at Greeley, Colorado
Reorganized 23 November 1895 at Greeley as Company D. 1st infantry Regiment. 
Mustered into Federal service 8 May 1898 at Camp Alva Adams, Denver, as Company D. 1st volunteer Infantry Regiment. (Home Guard Company D. 1st Infantry Regiment organized February 1899 at Greely)
Mustered out of Federal service 8 September 1899 at San Francisco, California and consolidated with Home Guard company D. 1st Infantry Regiment Colorado National guard.
Disbanded 27 May 1915 at Greeley
Reorganized 16 September 1921 at Greeley as Headquarters Company, 177th Infantry Regiment.
Redesignated 16 November 1921 as Headquarters Company 157th Infantry Regiment
Redesignated Headquarters Company (less antitank platoon), 157th Infantry Regiment and assigned to the 45th Infantry Division 1 September 1939
Reorganized and redesignated 1 November 1939 as Company B. 157th Infantry Regiment inducted into Federal service 16 September 1940 at Greeley
Inactivated 22 November 1945 at Camp Bowie, Texas
Relieved from the 45th division and redesignated Headquarters Company 2nd Battalion, 157th Infantry Regiment 10 may 1946.
Converted, reorganized and redesignated Headquarters and Headquarters Battery 142nd Field Artillery Battalion, 1 August 1955 ; concurrently remainder of battalion organized from existing units as follows.
 Company K. 157th Infantry Regiment at Fort Morgan redesignated Battery A.
 Company L. 157th Infantry Regiment at Sterling redesignated Battery B.
 Company C. 157th Infantry Regiment at Brush  redesignated Battery C.
 Company E. 157th Infantry Regiment at Greeley  redesignated Service Battery.
Battalion broken up 1 February 1959 and elements reorganized or consolidated as follows.
 Headquarters and Headquarters Battery and Service Battery at Greeley consolidated, reorganized and redesignated Company A. 140th Signal Battalion
 Battery A. at Fort Morgan  redesignated Service Battery 1st Howitzer Battalion 157th Field Artillery
 Batteries B, and C, at Sterling consolidated, reorganized and redesignated Battery B. 1st howitzer Battalion 157th Field Artillery

Campaign streamers
War with Spain
 Manila
Philippine Insurrection
 Manila
 Luzon 1899
World War II
 Sicily (with Arrowhead)
 Naples-Foggia (with Arrowhead)
 Anzio
 Rome Arno
 Southern France (with Arrowhead)
 Rhineland
 Ardennes-alsace
 Central Europe

Decorations
French Croix de Guerre with Palm, World War II, streamer embroidered Italy

Coat of arms
Shield
Per fess embattled or and gules, in chief two wigwams of the second, garnished of the first and in base a sea lion brandishing a sword in dexter paw of the last
 Crest
That for the regiments and separate battalions of the Colorado National guard
 Background
The shield is that of the coat of arms of the 157th Infantry with the colors reversed to indicate descent from that regiment. The colors scarlet and yellow are used for artillery. These colors are also the Spanish colors and with embattled partition line and the Philippine sea lion refer to the walled city of Manila in the Philippine Islands. The wigwams refer to Indian service in the frontier days.

References

External links
 Historical register and dictionary of the United States Army, from ..., Volume 1 By Francis Bernard Heitman 
 Encyclopedia of United States Army insignia and uniforms By William K. Emerson (page 51).
   lineage

Field artillery battalions of the United States Army
Military units and formations established in 1955
Military units and formations disestablished in 1959